Norodom Vichara (17 August 194628 July 2013) was a Cambodian princess and politician. She was a daughter of King Norodom Suramarit and a half-sister of King Norodom Sihanouk.  She belonged to FUNCINPEC and was elected to represent Phnom Penh Municipality in the National Assembly of Cambodia in 2003. According to a family relative, Vichara died on 28 July 2013, at the age of 66, from a lengthy battle with lung cancer.

References

1946 births
2013 deaths
Members of the National Assembly (Cambodia)
Cambodian princesses
FUNCINPEC politicians
Deaths from lung cancer in France
20th-century Cambodian women politicians
20th-century Cambodian politicians
21st-century Cambodian women politicians
21st-century Cambodian politicians
Daughters of kings